Hinter Gittern – Der Frauenknast (English: "Behind bars - The Women's Prison", in short: HG or HiGi) was a German television series in the form of a soap opera and told the dramaturgically oversubscribed-life in a prison for women. The series was broadcast from 22 September 1997 until 13 February 2007 at the private broadcaster RTL. The acts played in the fictional prison for women, Reutlitz in Berlin and included lesbian love affairs, drug deals, escape attempts, conflicts with sadistic prison guards, as well as crimes such as murder.

RTL decided to cancel the long running drama after 16 seasons and 403 episodes. The last nine episodes were transmitted during the night at 01.05 AM.

A Turkish adaption, Parmaklıklar Ardında (Behind Bars) is filmed in Sinop.

References

External links

1997 German television series debuts
2007 German television series endings
German-language television shows
German television soap operas
German LGBT-related television shows
Lesbian-related television shows
Prison television series
RTL (German TV channel) original programming
Imprisonment and detention of women
1990s prison television series
2000s prison television series
1990s LGBT-related drama television series
2000s LGBT-related drama television series